The Tijuana Country Club (Club Campestre de Tijuana) is a country club located in Tijuana, Mexico. The country club was the site of the historic Agua Caliente Open and Tijuana Open Invitational, former golf tournaments on the PGA Tour. The country club, as well as the accompanying golf course, is located in Boulevard Agua Caliente.

History
The golf course was originally designed in 1927 by William P. Bell. Famous professional golf players like Gene Sarazen, Paul Runyan, Dutch Harrison, and Ernie Vossler have played at the club. Though the clientele has become increasingly Mexican over the years, it remains popular with golfers across the border in California.  34-year-old Ivan Escobosa was abducted from the club in 2005.

PGA Tour pro Cesar Sanudo was introduced to golf when he started working as a caddie at the club.

Real estate developers have put the property under redevelopment pressure, but some progress to retain urban greenspace has been made with a restoration proposal from Mexican native golf architect Agustin Pizá</ref> Erik Anders Lang walked the property and promoted Pizá's Tijuana Country Club restoration project in his Adventures in Golf series on United Airlines.

Course

References

External links
 Tijuana Country Club

Golf clubs and courses in Tijuana
Golf clubs and courses in Mexico